Dalivier Ospina Navarro (born October 9, 1985) is a Colombian cyclist, who last rode for UCI Continental team . He rode in the 2013 Giro d'Italia.

Major results

2005
 1st  Time trial, National Under-23 Road Championships
2006
1st Prix des Vins Valloton
1st Sierre-Loye
2007
3rd Overall Tour des Pays de Savoie
2009
7th Overall Mi-Août en Bretagne
2010
8th Subida al Naranco
2012
8th Coppa Sabatini

References

External links

1985 births
Living people
Colombian male cyclists